Crépon is a commune in the Calvados department in the Normandy region in northwestern France.

Population

Architecture
Historic architecture :
 Parish church, Saint-Médard-et-Saint-Gildard, 12th-14th century
 Ferme de la Rançonnière (13th ‑ 15th) ;
 Manoir de Verdin (18th) ;
 Manoir du Clos de Mondeville (16th ‑ X19th) ;
 Manoir du Clos de Lhérondelle (17th) ;
 Manoir de la Grande Ferme (X17th) ;
 Manoir de Mathan (1st half of 17th - 1st half of 18th)
 Ferme du Colombier (18th - 1st quarter 19th) ;
 Manoir de la Baronnie et Ferme de la Baronnie (16th  ‑ 19th) ;
 Ferme des Fontaines (1st half 18th).

See also
Communes of the Calvados department

References

External links 

Ferme de la Rançonnière in Calvados
Manoir de Mathan in Low Normandy

Communes of Calvados (department)
Calvados communes articles needing translation from French Wikipedia